Admiral The Honourable Sir Edmund Robert Fremantle  (16 June 1836 – 10 February 1929) was a Royal Navy officer who served as Commander-in-Chief, Plymouth (at the time, and from 1845 to 1900, formally known as Commander-in-Chief, Devonport).

Naval career
Born a son of Thomas Fremantle, 1st Baron Cottesloe and Louisa Elizabeth Nugent, daughter of Sir George Nugent, 1st Baronet and a descendant, through Louisa's mother Maria Skinner, of the Schuyler family and Van Cortlandt family of British North America.

Fremantle joined the Royal Navy in 1849. He served in the Second Anglo-Burmese War in 1852 and the New Zealand Wars in 1864. Then in 1861 he became commander in HMS Eclipse.

Promoted to captain in 1867, he commanded HMS Barracouta, HMS Doris, HMS Lord Warden and HMS Invincible. He was made senior naval officer in Gibraltar in 1881 and then went on to command HMS Dreadnought. He was promoted rear-admiral in 1885 and was made second-in-command of the Channel Squadron in 1886 and Commander-in-Chief, East Indies Station in 1888. Promoted to vice-admiral from 1890 he went on to be Commander-in-Chief, China Station in 1892 and Commander-in-Chief, Plymouth in 1896. He was promoted to admiral later that year and retired in June 1901.

Fremantle was granted the honorary office of Rear-Admiral of the United Kingdom in July 1901, and kept this until 1926.

He was appointed Knight Grand Cross of the Order of the Bath in the 1899 Birthday Honours. He was described as "the Father of the British Navy" in Time magazine.

He later joined the British Fascists.

Family
On 31 August 1866, in Sydney, Edmund married Barberina Rogers Isaacs, eldest daughter of the Hon. Robert Mackintosh Isaacs, solicitor general of New South Wales. The oldest of their five sons, Admiral Sir Sydney Robert Fremantle, was born at sea on 16 November 1867.

References

External links
 

|-

|-

|-

1836 births
1929 deaths
Royal Navy admirals
Knights Grand Cross of the Order of the Bath
Companions of the Order of St Michael and St George
Younger sons of barons
English people of Dutch descent
Schuyler family
Van Cortlandt family
British fascists
English people of American descent
Knights Grand Cross of the Royal Victorian Order